Helene Stöcker (13 November 1869 – 24 February 1943) was a German feminist, pacifist and gender activist. She successfully campaigned keep same sex relationships between women legal, but she was unsuccessful in her campaign to legalise abortion. She was a pacifist in Germany. As war emerged she fled to Norway and as that was invaded she moved to Japan and emigrated to America in 1942.

Life 
Born in Wuppertal, Stöcker was raised in a Calvinist household and attended a school for girls which emphasised rationality and morality. She moved to Berlin to continue her education and then she studied at the University of Bern, where she became one of the first German women to receive her doctorate. In 1905 she helped found the League for the Protection of Mothers (Bund für Mutterschutz, BfM), and she became the editor of the organisation's magazine Mutterschutz (1905–1908) and then Die Neue Generation (1906–1932).

In 1909, she joined Magnus Hirschfeld in successfully lobbying German parliament from including lesbian women in the law criminalising homosexuality. Stöcker's influential new philosophy, called the New Ethic, advocated the equality of illegitimate children, legalisation of abortion, and sexual education, all in the service of creating deeper relationships between men and women which would eventually achieve women's political and social equality. This was received with dismay from more conservative women's organisations in Imperial Germany.

During World War I and the Weimar period, Stöcker's interest shifted to activities in the peace movement. In 1921 in Bilthoven, together with Kees Boeke and Wilfred Wellock, she founded an organisation with the name Paco (the Esperanto word for "peace") and later known as War Resisters' International (Internationale der Kriegsdienstgegner, WRI). She was also very active in the Weimar sexual reform movement. The Bund für Mutterschutz sponsored a number of sexual health clinics, which employed both lay and medical personnel, where women and men could go for contraception, marriage advice, and sometimes abortions and sterilisation. From 1929 to 1932, she took one last stand for abortion rights. After a papal encyclical, the Casti connubii, issued on 31 December 1930 denounced sex without the intent to procreate, the radical sexual reform movement collaborated with the Socialist and Communist parties to launch one final campaign against paragraph 218, which prohibited abortion. Stöcker added her iconic voice to a campaign that ultimately failed.

When the Nazis came to power in Germany, Stöcker fled first to Switzerland and then to England when the Nazis invaded Austria. Stöcker was attending a PEN writers conference in Sweden when war broke out and remained there until the Nazis invaded Norway, at which point she took the Trans-Siberian Railway to Japan and finally ended up in the United States in 1942. She moved into an apartment on Riverside Drive in NYC and died there of cancer in 1943.

Published works

Books 
 1906 – Die Liebe und die Frauen. Ein Manifest der Emanzipation von Frau und Mann im deutschen Kaiserreich.
 1928 – Verkünder und Verwirklicher. Beiträge zum Gewaltproblem.

Papers 
 Frauen-Rundschau, 1903–1922
 Mutterschutz, newspaper of the Bund für Mutterschutz, published from 1905 to 1907.
 Die Neue Generation, 1908–1932.

References 

Other sources
 Atina Grossmann: Reforming Sex: The German Movement for Birth Control and Abortion Reform, 1920–1950. Oxford University Press, Oxford, 1995. 
 Christl Wickert: Helene Stöcker 1869–1943. Frauenrechtlerin, Sexualreformerin und Pazifistin. Dietz Verlag, Bonn, 1991. 
 Gudrun Hamelmann: Helene Stöcker, der 'Bund für Mutterschutz' und 'Die Neue Generation'. Haag Verlag, Frankfurt am Main, 1998. 
 Rolf von Bockel: Philosophin einer 'neuen Ethik': Helene Stöcker (1869–1943). 1991. 
 Annegret Stopczyk-Pfundstein: Philosophin der Liebe. Helene Stöcker. BoD Norderstedt, 2003.

Further reading 
 Edward Ross Dickinson, Sex, Freedom, and Power in Imperial Germany, 1880–1914, Cambridge University Press, 2014. 

1869 births
1943 deaths
20th-century German women writers
Writers from Wuppertal
People from the Rhine Province
German feminists
German pacifists
German Peace Society members
Deaths from cancer in New York (state)
German LGBT rights activists
Women civil rights activists
Emigrants from Nazi Germany to Switzerland